Emiliano Spataro (born May 25, 1976, in Lanús, Buenos Aires) is an Argentine racing driver. He has run in different series, with major success in Turismo Carretera, TC 2000, Top Race and Formula Three Sudamericana. He also raced at the 2010 Dakar Rally.

Career 
1992: Karting
1993: Karting
1994: Fórmula Honda Argentina
1995: Formula Three Sudamericana Light (Champion)
1996: Italian Super Formula, one win
1997: Formula 3000; South American Super Touring Car Championship (BMW 320i)
1998: South American Super Touring Car Championship (Alfa Romeo 155)
1999: South American Super Touring Car Championship (Peugeot 406)(Champion), with Cacá Bueno
2000: TC2000 (Peugeot 306) Peugeot Sport
2001: TC2000 (Peugeot 306) Peugeot Sport
2002: TC2000, Turismo Carretera (Chevrolet)
2003: TC2000
2004: TC2000 Sportteam (Volkswagen Bora) and DTA (Chevrolet Astra)
2005: TC2000 Sportteam (Volkswagen Bora)
2006: TC2000 Sportteam (Volkswagen Bora), ninth; Turismo Carretera
2007: TC2000 Renault (Renault Mégane), sixth; Turismo Carretera BA; TRV6 Oro (champion)
2008: Turismo Carretera BA, Haz; TRV6 Oro (champion)
2009: TC2000 Fiat (Fiat Linea); Turismo Carretera Plavicon, BA; TRV6 Midas
2010: TC2000 Fiat (Fiat Linea), fourth; Turismo Carretera SFP, Alifraco (Chevrolet); TRV6 Midas

External links
Official site 

TC 2000 Championship drivers
Turismo Carretera drivers
Top Race V6 drivers
Living people
Argentine people of Italian descent
Formula Renault Argentina drivers
Argentine racing drivers
Formula 3 Sudamericana drivers
International Formula 3000 drivers
1976 births
Dakar Rally drivers
Sportspeople from Lanús
Súper TC 2000 drivers
Scuderia Coloni drivers